Annamária Bogdanović (also Bogdanovics; née Orbán; born 14 April 1982) is a former Hungarian handballer who played for Siófok KC. She has also been capped for the Hungarian national team. In 2016 she got 4 years suspension by the Hungarian Anti-Doping Group after she provided positive doping samples.

Personal
She is married to former Debreceni VSC footballer Igor Bogdanović. The couple has a daughter, named Tamara.

Achievements 
Nemzeti Bajnokság I:
Silver Medallist: 2010, 2011
Bronze Medallist: 2009
Magyar Kupa:
Silver Medallist: 2009, 2011
EHF Cup:
Semifinalist: 2006

References

External links 
 Annamária Bogdanović player profile on DVSC-Korvex Official Website
 Annamária Bogdanović career statistics on Worldhandball.com

1982 births
Living people
People from Odorheiu Secuiesc
Hungarian female handball players
Siófok KC players